Mastododera tibialis is a species of beetle in the family Cerambycidae. It was described by Fairmaire in 1894.

References

Dorcasominae
Beetles described in 1894